The ribbon slider or ribbon lerista (Lerista taeniata) is a species of skink found in Northern Territory and Western Australia.

References

Lerista
Reptiles described in 1986
Taxa named by Glen Milton Storr